Agent Provocateur were a British electronica band, consisting of John Gosling, Matthew Ashman (Bow Wow Wow), Dan Peppe, Danny Saber (Black Grape) and Cleo Torez. When Ashman died in 1995 he was replaced on guitar by Lance Burman (formerly of Chiefs of Relief).

History
The band's first single, "Kicks", was released in 1995, and they went on to perform in London supporting Royal Trux. In 1997 they released the album Where the Wild Things Are, which had been started before Ashman's death, and featured Shaun Ryder on vocals on the track "Agent Dan", which was a top 50 hit in the UK when released as a single.

On the fifteenth anniversary of Ashman's death, the band reunited for a tribute concert on 21 November 2010, at the Scala in London, in a show with Adam Ant topping the bill and also featuring later Ashman bands Bow Wow Wow and Chiefs of Relief.

Discography

Studio albums
 Where the Wild Things Are (1997), Wall of Sound

EPs
 The Phat and Ratty (1997), Epic

Singles

References

English electronic music groups
Big beat groups